Gipsy Hill railway station is in the London Borough of Lambeth in south London. The station, and all trains serving it, are operated by Southern, and it is in Travelcard Zone 3.

Accidents and incidents
On 14 February 1990, Class 455 electric multiple unit 5802 collided with a fallen tree obstructing the line. Unit 5820 then collided with 5802.

Services 
All services at Gipsy Hill are operated by Southern using  EMUs.

The typical off-peak service in trains per hour is:
 4 tph to 
 2 tph to 
 2 tph to 

During the evenings, the services between London Victoria and West Croydon do not run and the services between London Bridge and Beckenham Junction are reduced to hourly.

On Sundays, the services between London Bridge and Beckenham Junction do not run.

Connections 
London Buses route 322 serves the station.

Gallery

References

External links 

Railway stations in the London Borough of Lambeth
Former London, Brighton and South Coast Railway stations
Railway stations in Great Britain opened in 1856
Railway stations served by Govia Thameslink Railway